Rein Taagepera (born 28 February 1933) is an Estonian political scientist and former politician.

Education 
Born in Tartu, Estonia, Taagepera fled from occupied Estonia in 1944. Taagepera graduated from high school in Marrakech, Morocco, and then studied physics in Canada and the United States. He received a B.A. Sc (Nuclear Engineering) in 1959 and a M.A. (Physics) in 1961 from the University of Toronto, and a Ph.D. from the University of Delaware in 1965. Working in industry until 1970, he received another M.A. in international relations in 1969 and moved to academia as a political scientist at the University of California, Irvine, where he stayed for his entire American career. Taagepera is professor emeritus at the University of Tartu.

Political career 
Taagepera served as president of the Association for the Advancement of Baltic Studies from 1986 until 1988. In 1991, he returned to Estonia as the founding dean of a new School of Social Sciences at the University of Tartu, which merged into a full-fledged faculty in 1994, and where he also became professor of political science (1994–1998).

In 1991, he was a member of the Estonian Constitutional Assembly, and in 1992, he ran as a presidential candidate against Arnold Rüütel (3rd President of the Republic of Estonia, 2001–2006), and Lennart Meri (2nd President of the Republic of Estonia, 1992–2001), who won the election. Taagepera came in third with 23% of the popular vote. Later Taagepera admitted that one of the reasons why he ran, despite having little chance to win, was to take away votes from Rüütel and thus help Meri rise to the presidency.

In 2003, Taagepera agreed to serve for half a year as the founding chairman of a new political party, Res Publica, which won the general elections that year and lead the governing coalition under Prime Minister Juhan Parts until April 2005. Taagepera tried to hold the party more or less in the middle of the spectrum (Taagepera even suggested he was centre-left politician). In 2005, Taagepera resigned his Res Publica membership, frustrated with the party's leadership style and move to the right (refer to his essay, Meteoric trajectory). In April 2006, Res Publica decided to merge with the national-conservative Pro Patria Union party.

Scholarly works
Taagepera's theoretical scholarly work, which mainly deals with electoral systems, is heavily quantitative and modelling in character and strongly informed by the epistemology of his previous field, physics. The quantitative approach is also his general attitude towards political science as a scholarly discipline. He recently systematized numerous contributions in electoral systems theory into a general, quantitative theoretical framework, exposed in the volume Predicting Party Sizes: The Logic of Simple Electoral Systems (2007).

Taagepera's original epistemological and methodological approach, defined as logical quantitative modeling, is systematically presented in the recent volume Making Social Sciences More Scientific. The Need for Predictive Models (2008). Of special interest is his research in the World System hyperbolic growth.

Apart from the quantitative study of electoral and party systems, Taagepera has also published several studies of Estonian and Baltic history, politics, and culture. These latter, on the other hand, are more personal and take strong normative positions. Taagepera has also written award-winning pieces of prose (most notably Livland-Leaveland in 1990. It was awarded the Tuglas Prize in the same year).

Key publications
Size and Duration of Empires: Systematics of Size, 1978 
Size and Duration of Empires: Growth-Decline Curves, 3000 to 600 B.C., 1978 
Size and Duration of Empires: Growth-Decline Curves, 600 B.C. to 600 A.D., 1979 
Seats and Votes: The Effects and Determinants of Electoral Systems, 1989, co-author
Estonia: Return to independence, 1993
The Baltic States: Years of Dependence, 1940-1990, 2nd edn. 1993, co-author 
Expansion and Contraction Patterns of Large Polities: Context for Russia, 1997 
The Finno-Ugric republics and the Russian state, 1999
"Meteoric trajectory: The Res Publica Party in Estonia" (2006), Democratization 13(1): 78-94. the original conference paper as pdf file This essay gives a moderately candid account of Taagepera's Res Publica chairmanship and his evaluation of the party and its rise and fall.
Predicting Party Sizes: The Logic of Simple Electoral Systems, 2007 
Making Social Sciences More Scientific. The Need for Predictive Models, 2008 
Parsimonious model for predicting mean cabinet duration on the basis of electoral system (with Allan Sikk), Party Politics, 2010.

Recognition 
Taagepera received the American Political Science Association's Hallett (1999) and Longley (2003) Awards as well as the Estonian National Science Prize, Social Science Category (1999), the Johan Skytte Prize in Political Science (2008), and the Karl Deutsch Award (2016).

References

External links 
 Rein Taagepera's profile in the University of California - Irvine website

1933 births
Living people
Estonian political scientists
Politicians from Tartu
Writers from Tartu
University of California, Irvine faculty
Estonian non-fiction writers
Estonian World War II refugees
Estonian emigrants to the United States
Academic staff of the University of Tartu
Recipients of the Order of the National Coat of Arms, 2nd Class
University of Delaware alumni
20th-century Estonian politicians
21st-century Estonian politicians
20th-century Estonian writers
21st-century Estonian writers